Michael J. Irwin is a British astronomer. He is the director of the Cambridge Astronomical Survey Unit and one of the discoverers of the Cetus Dwarf galaxy and the Sagittarius Dwarf Elliptical Galaxy.

Research 
Irwin is known worldwide for the leading role he plays in processing of digital optical and infra-red survey data. Currently, his efforts in processing of digital optical and infrared survey data of Vista Data Flow are being used for processing United Kingdom Infrared Telescope data.

Awards and honours 
In 2012, Royal Astronomical Society awarded Michael Irwin the 2012 Herschel Medal, which recognises investigations of outstanding merit in observational astrophysics. He has also made contributions in the scientific community by writing and helping write several books.

List of discovered minor planets 

According to the Minor Planet Center's official discoverer list, Irwin co-discovered 8 minor planets during 1990–1996.

References

External links 

 Home page for Mike Irwin, Institute of Astronomy, Cambridge, UK

21st-century British astronomers
Discoverers of minor planets
Discoveries by Michael J. Irwin
Living people
Year of birth missing (living people)
20th-century British astronomers
Professors of Astrophysics (Cambridge)